The Three Mountains King Temple is a temple in Jiuru Township, Pingtung County, Taiwan.

Name
The Three Mountains part of the temple name refers to the three mountains in Mainland China, which are Mount Du, Mount Ming and Mount Jing.

History
The temple was constructed in 1651 and is dedicated to Lords of the Three Mountains.

Architecture
The temple is a traditional Hakka-style building listed as the 3rd category of historical building by the government. The roof of the temple is a tail-shaped structure divided into three sections. The temple building is divided into three prayer rooms and two wings.

See also
 Chaolin Temple
 Donglong Temple
 Checheng Fuan Temple
 List of temples in Taiwan
 List of tourist attractions in Taiwan

References

1651 establishments in Taiwan
Temples in Pingtung County
Taoist temples in Taiwan